Chi Chi (born  1945) is the stage name of Carole Varleta, lead singer of the Hippies, whose 1963 hit song was "Memory Lane". It was recorded on the Parkway Records label in New Jersey. The name "Chi Chi" was a nickname given Carole by her father, and used by her friends. When the Philadelphia DJ Jerry Blavat started calling her Chi Chi, the name stuck with the public.

At the age of 14 or 15, while living in an orphanage, she started The Impalas along with the following students of Roxborough High School in New Jersey: Howard Boggess aka Boogie (who wrote "Memory Lane"); Nancy Orth (piano player, who also lived in the orphanage); and Jack Felker. Later they added Cookie, who provided needed harmony. The Impalas won first place in the high school talent show singing "Memory Lane".

Bud Brees a local DJ (WPEN Radio 950 AM) heard them sing at the Germantown, New York and became their agent. The group became locally popular. Bud changed the name to the Tams, because other groups were using the name The Impalas. The Tams recorded "Memory Lane" on The Mink label, which was a collaboration between Bud and songwriter Russ Faith. Later, Chi Chi and Boggie moved to Heritage Records and recorded "If Love Were Like Rivers" with two other male singers. In 1962, an alternate version of "Memory Lane" was waxed by the group and released on Parkway by the Tams. In 1963, the group name was changed to the Hippies because another group was using the name The Tams. "Memory Lane" was again recorded by Parkway and reached No. 63 after 5 weeks on the Billboard Hot 100 chart. Then the payola scandal hit resulting in all records getting air play being taken off the air.

Jerry Blavat released an album which included "Memory Lane" (April, 1963). In June 1964, Red Bird released "I Know He Loves Me" by Chi Chi.  WAMS Radio DJ Ralph McKinney (1380 AM) later hosted the nationally syndicated show - Memory Lane - which used Chi Chi's "Memory Lane" as walk on and walk off music.

References

American women pop singers